Jessica Heap (born March 4, 1983) is an American former actress. She is perhaps best known for her portrayal of Eden Baldwin on the CBS soap opera The Young and the Restless. She has also appeared on various television series including CSI: Miami. In addition to television, Heap has made appearances in the films Battle: Los Angeles, Sinners and Saints, I Love You Philip Morris, Death Toll, and Spring Break '83, as well as in the made-for-television films Fab Five: The Texas Cheerleader Scandal and Journey to Promethea.

Career

The Young and the Restless
In June 2011, it was announced that Heap had been cast in the role of Eden Baldwin, a character previously portrayed by Vanessa Marano. Of her first day, Heap said: "When I worked my first day, I was shooting two episodes, all back to back. So it was a lot of dialogue, a lot of material and it really helped having someone there who was like 'Here's what's happening,' as it was going on. For me, I'm just loving it, because I’m learning from people like Christian and these other great actors and I’m learning new skills." After a year in the role, it was announced that Heap was to exit the soap. The actress later confirmed her departure on Twitter, saying she'd completed filming and described her experience on the show as "an unforgettable ride".

Filmography

References

External links
 
 
 

1983 births
Living people
Actresses from Baton Rouge, Louisiana
American film actresses
American television actresses
American soap opera actresses
21st-century American women